"Just Might Have Her Radio On" is a song recorded by American country music artist Trent Tomlinson. It was released in March 2007 as the third single from his debut album Country Is My Rock. Tomlinson co-wrote the song with Ashe Underwood.

Critical reception
Kevin John Coyne of Country Universe gave the song a B+ grade, writing that "Tomlinson sounds great delivering it and it’s as authentically country as anything you might actually hear on the radio these days."

Music video
The music video was directed by Steve Cook and premiered in December 2007.

Chart performance
The song debuted at number 52 on the U.S. Billboard Hot Country Songs chart for the week of April 7, 2007.

References

2007 singles
Trent Tomlinson songs
Lyric Street Records singles
2006 songs
Songs written by Trent Tomlinson